Iberg may refer to:

 Iberg (Allgäu Alps), a mountain in Germany
 Iberg (Harz), a hill in Germany
 Iberg (Upland), a mountain in Germany
 Iberg (Winterthur), a quarter in the Seen district of Winterthur, Switzerland
 Iberg Castle, St. Gallen, Switzerland
 Iberg Castle, Aargau, Switzerland
 Helge Iberg (born 1954), Norwegian contemporary composer

See also

 Yberg, a mountain of Baden-Württemberg, Germany
 Bad Iburg, a town in Lower Saxony, Germany